Lødingen is a municipality in Nordland county in Norway. Lødingen is located on the southeastern corner of the island of Hinnøya, and is part of the traditional district of Ofoten. The administrative centre of the municipality is the village of Lødingen. The other main part of the municipality is Vestbygda. Lødingen has the nickname "Biketown" because it hosts several annual bicycle races, including "Lofoten Insomnia" and Vestbygd-rittet.

The  municipality is by area the 202nd largest out of the 356 municipalities in Norway. Lødingen is the 282nd most populous municipality in Norway with a population of 1,976.

General information

The municipality of Lødingen was established on 1 January 1838 (see formannskapsdistrikt law). On 1 January 1869, the southern district of Lødingen surrounding the Tysfjorden on the mainland (population: 1,402) was separated to form the new Tysfjord Municipality. This left 2,064 residents in Lødingen. Then on 1 January 1909, the northeastern district of Lødingen (population: 1,404) was separated to form the new Tjeldsund Municipality. This left 3,034 residents in Lødingen.

During the 1960s, there were many municipal mergers across Norway due to the work of the Schei Committee. On 1 January 1962, the southern mainland part of Lødingen surrounding the Efjorden and the island of Barøya (population: 433) were transferred to Ballangen Municipality. Then on 1 January 1964, the eastern part of Lødingen on the island of Tjeldøya (population: 297) was transferred to Tjeldsund Municipality.

Name
The municipality (originally the parish) is named after the old Lødingen farm since the first Lødingen Church was built there.

Coat of arms
The coat of arms was granted on 11 May 1984. The official blazon is "Gules, a five-looped knot Or". This means the arms have a red field (background) and the charge is a five-looped knot that is made out of woollen thread and folded to look like a flower with five leaves. The woolen knot has a tincture of Or which means it is commonly colored yellow, but if it is made out of metal, then gold is used. The design was chosen to symbolize that the municipality is at the junction of road, shipping, and ferry routes to five areas: Lofoten, Ofoten, Salten, Vesterålen, and Southern Troms. It is also located between five fjords: Vestfjorden, Ofotfjorden, Tysfjorden, Tjeldsundet, and Gullesfjorden. The symbol is also an ancient symbol for good fortune. The arms were designed by Øysten H. Skaugvolldal.

Churches
The Church of Norway has one parish within the municipality of Lødingen. It is part of the Ofoten prosti (deanery) in the Diocese of Sør-Hålogaland.

Government
All municipalities in Norway, including Lødingen, are responsible for primary education (through 10th grade), outpatient health services, senior citizen services, unemployment and other social services, zoning, economic development, and municipal roads. The municipality is governed by a municipal council of elected representatives, which in turn elect a mayor.  The municipality falls under the Ofoten District Court and the Hålogaland Court of Appeal.

Municipal council
The municipal council of Lødingen is made up of 17 representatives that are elected to four year terms. The party breakdown of the council is as follows:

Mayors
The mayors of Lødingen:

 1838–1840: Niels Nordbye 
 1840-1844: Jens Hagerup Krog
 1844–1846: Bendix Normann 
 1846–1848: Johan T. Lampe 
 1848–1850: Alexander Falch 
 1850–1852: Andreas Otterbech 
 1852–1854: Willum Lind 
 1854–1859: Severin Samuelsen 
 1859–1860: Petter Kjelsberg 
 1860–1861: Severin Samuelsen 
 1861–1863: Alexander Falck 
 1863-1877: Anders Stoltenberg
 1877–1880: Bernhard Kokk
 1880–1882: A. Roll
 1882–1884: Bernhard Kokk
 1884–1885: Arent Schøning
 1885–1904: Petter Møkleby
 1904–1907: K. Strømstad 
 1907–1918: Gulbrand Kløvstad
 1919–1922: K. Strømstad
 1922-1928: Leonhard C. B. Holmboe
 1928–1934: Andreas Didriksen 
 1935–1945: Leif Hartz Floan 
 1946–1955: Øivind Martinussen (Ap)
 1955–1967: Einar Ytterstad (H)
 1968–1969: Reidar Rødø (H)
 1970–1975: Sigvald Johansen (Ap)
 1975–1983: Gunnar Bernhoft (H)
 1983–1991: Normann Aasjord (H)
 1991–1995: Bjørn Myrlund (H)
 1995–1999: Bjørn Hegstad (V)
 1999-2003: Eirik Eriksen (Ap)
 2003-2007: Kurt Olsen (SV)
 2007-2011: Vibeke Tveit (Ap)
 2011-2015: Anita Marthinussen (H)
 2015-2019: Atle Andersen (Ap)
 2019–present: Hugo Bongard Jacobsen (Ap)

Geography
The municipality encompasses the southern part of the island of Hinnøya. The terrain is mountainous, with several small islands and fjords. The administrative centre of the municipality is the village of Lødingen, located at the inner part of the Vestfjorden at the southern entrance of the Tjeldsundet strait. Lødingen is an important ferry harbor, the car ferry to/from Bognes in Tysfjord leaves 12 times per day and takes 60 minutes. Møysalen National Park is located in the northern part of the municipality. It's named after the mountain Møysalen on the municipal border between Lødingen and Sortland. The Rotvær Lighthouse is located in Lødingen.

Climate
Lødingen has continental subarctic climate in the 1961-1990 period. The Köppen Climate Classification subtype for this climate is "Dfc".

Attractions

 Eye in Stone (Øye i stein), part of Artscape Nordland (Skulpturlandskap Nordland)
 Norwegian Telecom Museum, telegraphy
 Pilotage Service Museum
 Rotvær Lighthouse

Notable people 
 Christopher Nyrop (1680–1733) a theologian and Bishop of Christianssand
 Dagfinn Bakke (1933–2019) a painter, illustrator and printmaker
 Dagfinn Henrik Olsen (born 1966) a Norwegian politician

References

External links
Municipal fact sheet from Statistics Norway 

Skulpturlandskap Nordland 
Norwegian Telecom Museum 

 
Municipalities of Nordland
Populated places of Arctic Norway
1838 establishments in Norway